Gayle Tzemach Lemmon (born 7 September 1973) is an author who has written on the role of women and girls in foreign policy. She has held private sector roles in emerging technology for national security as well as financial services. She serves as an adjunct senior fellow at the Women and Foreign Policy Program with the Council on Foreign Relations and has written the New York Times bestsellers The Dressmaker of Khair Khana (2011), Ashley’s War: The Untold Story of a Team of Women Soldiers on the Special Ops Battlefield (2015) and The Daughters of Kobani: A Story of Rebellion, Courage, and Justice (2021). A graduate of the University of Missouri and the Harvard Business School, Lemmon has covered a variety of topics such as women's entrepreneurship, women in the military, forced and child marriage, Syria and Afghanistan.  She has also served as a board member of the Mercy Corps and the International Center for Research on Women, and as a member of the Bretton Woods Committee. She speaks Spanish, German, French and is conversant in Dari and basic Kurmanji.

Education and early career
Born to a Jewish family, the daughter of an Iraqi father and Rhoda Miriam Spielman Tzemach (died 1987). Her mother raised her as a single parent in Greenbelt, Maryland, her grandmother was Frances Cohen Spielman (died 1999), a World War II veteran of Women's Army Corps and an independent film distributor during the 1940s who later founded First Run Features. Her paternal family comes from Iraq, partly from Iraqi Kurdistan. Her father was born in Baghdad but was forced to leave the country as a child due to his religion.

Lemmon earned a BA in journalism summa cum laude from the University of Missouri School of Journalism. From 1997 to 2004, she worked in the ABC News Political Unit, where she covered presidential politics and public policy issues, and served as producer in the first year of This Week with George Stephanopoulos. During that time, she visited Spain as a Fulbright Scholar and Germany as a Robert Bosch Fellow.

In 2004, Lemmon started MBA study at Harvard. During the study, she began writing about women's entrepreneurship in conflict and post-conflict zones, traveling to Rwanda and Afghanistan. Lemmon graduated with an MBA two years later, and received the HBS 2006 Dean's Award for her work on the subject. She then continued working on women's entrepreneurship in the world, covering more countries such as Bosnia and Liberia.

From 2006 to 2010, she worked in the executive office and in emerging markets at the global investment firm PIMCO, leading public policy analysis. During the time, she consulted for the World Bank and co-authored a 2008 report Doing Business: Women in Africa. In 2010, she was featured on the cover of the HBS alumni magazine for her work on entrepreneurs in conflict and post-conflict zones.

Writing and public speaking career
In 2011, Lemmon wrote the first Tina Brown Newsweek cover article, featuring an interview with Hillary Clinton on former Secretary of State's push to put women at the center of U.S. foreign policy. The same year, her book, The Dressmaker of Khair Khana, was published by HarperCollins. The story about Kamila Sidiqi, a young Afghan entrepreneur who supports her community under the Taliban rule, was the New York Times nonfiction bestseller. In December 2011, she gave the opening talk at TEDxWomen, in which she described why investing in women can make the difference for the global economy.

She is also the author of Entrepreneurship in Postconflict Zones, a 2012 CFR working paper that argues for comprehensive, long-term, collaborative approaches to help entrepreneurs in conflict and post-conflict countries overcome challenges in accessing capital, markets, networks, and business skills training. The same year, she began writing a number of pieces on women and girls for The Atlantic, including We Need to Tell Girls They Can Have It All (Even If They Can't), which was mentioned in Sheryl Sandberg's 2013 book Lean In: Women, Work, and The Will to Lead, and on the lessons she learned growing up in a community of single mothers.

In October 2013, Lemmon broke the first media story about how the military could not pay death benefits to fallen soldiers killed in action during the government shutdown. The story attracted the attention of the Pentagon and the White House, and Fisher House eventually stepped in to fill the funding gap until the shutdown ended. In December of the same year, she published a policy innovation memorandum, titled Banking on Growth, making the case for why the United States should support the creation of an American development bank to invest in small and medium-businesses in the world's toughest economies.

In 2014, she authored two CFR working papers on the topic: High Stakes for Young Lives, coauthored with Lynn ElHarake, surveys strategies to stop child marriage; and Fragile States, Fragile Lives that examines the correlation between child marriage and state fragility. This work culminated in a CFR e-book publication Child Brides, Global Consequences: How to End Child Marriage. In September the next year, Lemmon reported on the issue of child and forced marriage in the United States for the PBS NewsHour in a two-part series.

Her next book, Ashley's War: The Untold Story of a Team of Women Soldiers on the Special Ops Battlefield, was published by HarperCollins in 2015. It tells the story of CST-2, a unit of women handpicked from across the U.S. army to serve on combat operations alongside Army Rangers and Navy SEALs in Afghanistan, and of the remarkable hero at its heart: First Lieutenant Ashley White. The book, Lemmon's second New York Times bestseller, is being made into a film by Reese Witherspoon and Bruna Papandrea, with Lesli Linka Glatter and Molly Smith Metzler attached to direct and write it respectively.  Lemmon also gave a TED Talk on Ashley's War at TEDWomen 2015, receiving more than one million views.

In 2021, Penguin Press published The Daughters of Kobani, the latest book authored by Lemmon. It is about a group of Syrian Kurdish women fighting against ISIS. According to Kirkus Reviews, it is "a well-told story of contemporary female warriors and the complex geopolitical realities behind their battles." The story, being another New York Times bestseller, has been optioned by HiddenLight Productions for TV.

Throughout her career, Lemmon has written on women's entrepreneurship and women in the military, forced and child marriage, girls’ ambition and single mothers, along with the role of women and girls in conflict  for a variety of news outlets, including The New York Times, Financial Times, Foreign Policy, Ms. Magazine, among others. Lemmon has given talks at the Aspen Security Forum, TED forums, Clinton Global Initiative, West Point, the National Infantry Museum, and so on.

Works

Op-eds and articles
 More articles here. 
 See all Defense One articles here. 
 When Their Hell Becomes Ours, CNN, January 9, 2015
 Too Young to Marry, Ms. Magazine, February 20, 2015
 Outrage After a Woman’s Burning Shows a Changing Afghanistan, CNN, March 31, 2015
 19 Women Washed Out of Army Ranger School. That’s Actually a Good Thing, Washington Post, May 13, 2015
 The Army’s All-Women Special Ops Teams Show Us How We’ll Win Tomorrow’s Wars, Washington Post, May 19, 2015
 How CrossFit Bonded Together an Elite Team of Female Soldiers, Yahoo Health, May 26, 2015
 When G.I. Jane Comes Home, Los Angeles Times, June 11, 2015
 America’s Next Social Battlefield Is on the Actual Battlefield, Fortune.com, July 15, 2015
 Safe Enough to Thrive, Ms. Magazine, July 15, 2015
 Missing in Action, The Atlantic, August 4, 2015
 Meet the First Class of Women to Graduate From Army Ranger School, Foreign Policy, August 17, 2015
 Army Ranger Female Graduates Won’t Be Last, CNN, August 19, 2015
 The Women of the Army Rangers’ Cultural Support Teams, New York Times, September 14, 2015
 Rejecting Syrian Refugees Goes Against American Ideals, Fox News, November 20, 2015
 Women in Combat? They’ve Already Been Serving on the Front Lines, with Heroism, Los Angeles Times, December 4, 2015
 What Syria’s Refugees Told Me: The Ongoing Crisis and our American Values, Fox News, December 10, 2015
 A Syrian Mother Finds a Lifeline to Help Her Teenage Daughter “Start Living” Again, New York Times, December 14, 2015
 What We Need to Know About Refugees, CNN, December 17, 2015
 Syrian Refugees: Desperate to Go to School, CNN, March 2, 2016
 What Trump’s Proposed Ban on Muslims Really Threatens, Task & Purpose, May 20, 2016
 Women in the Military Finally Getting Respect, CNN, May 28, 2016
 We Must Not Let Orlando Terror Divide Us and Define Who We Are as Americans, FOX News, June 16, 2016
 The Reality Anti-Muslim Rhetoric Ignores, CNN, June 27, 2016
 What Comes Next After Raqqa and Mosul? , Defense One, July 6, 2016
 Why Dropping ‘Man’ From Military Titles Isn’t About Political Correctness, Fortune, July 13, 2016
 Gold Star Families Deserve Better Than One News Cycle, Defense One, July 31, 2016
 A Syrian War By Other Means, Foreign Affairs, August 17, 2016
 When Allies Become Enemies (Before the War is Over), Obama’s ISIS Plan Has Another Problem, Defense One, August 31, 2016
 When Women Lead Soldiers Into Battle, The Atlantic, September 9, 2016
 How I came to report on forced marriage — in the U.S., PBS NewsHour, September 14, 2016
 Aleppo: Where children die, but the world does nothing, CNN, September 29, 2016
 There’s a Way Obama’s White House Can Save Syrian Lives, There’s Just No Will, Defense One, October 6, 2016
 The US can't afford to forget its wars -- or why it fights them, CNN, October 7, 2016
 Trump's tape won't sway his base, but will it change our culture?, CNN, October 10, 2016
 In an echo chamber, journalists go deaf, Chicago Tribune, November 10, 2016
 Remembering America's forgotten wars, CNN, December 6, 2016
 'Responsibility to protect?' Empty words after Aleppo, CNN, December 14, 2016

References

External links
 Official website: GayleLemmon.com
 Defense One: Gayle Lemmon Articles
 
 

American non-fiction writers
Jewish American writers
Jewish American journalists
People from Greenbelt, Maryland
Harvard Business School alumni
1970s births
Living people
University of Missouri alumni
CNN people
21st-century American Jews